Scotopteryx is a genus of moths of the family Geometridae described by Jacob Hübner in 1825. It is suspected that some species currently placed here actually belong in Entephria.

Selected species
 Scotopteryx aelptes (Prout, 1937)
 Scotopteryx alfacaria (Staudinger, 1859)
 Scotopteryx alpherakii (Erschoff, 1877)
 Scotopteryx angularia (de Villers, 1789)
 Scotopteryx bipunctaria (Denis & Schiffermüller, 1775)
 Scotopteryx bipunctaria bipunctaria (Denis & Schiffermüller, 1775)
 Scotopteryx bipunctaria cretata (Prout, 1937)
 Scotopteryx bipunctaria maritima (Seebold, 1879)
 Scotopteryx burgaria (Eversmann, 1843)
 Scotopteryx chenopodiata (Linnaeus, 1758) – shaded broad-bar
 Scotopteryx coarctaria (Denis & Schiffermüller, 1775)
 Scotopteryx coelinaria (de Graslin, 1863)
 Scotopteryx diniensis (Neuburger, 1906)
 Scotopteryx elbursica (Bytinski-Salz & Brandt, 1935)
 Scotopteryx golovushkini Kostyuk, 1991
 Scotopteryx ignorata Huemer & Hausmann, 1998
 Scotopteryx junctata (Staudinger, 1882)
 Scotopteryx kurmanjiana Rajaei & László, 2014
 Scotopteryx kuznetsovi (Wardikjan, 1957)
 Scotopteryx langi (Christoph, 1885)
 Scotopteryx luridata (Hufnagel, 1767)
 Scotopteryx luridata luridata (Hufnagel, 1767)
 Scotopteryx luridata plumbaria (Fabricius, 1775)
 Scotopteryx moeniata (Scopoli, 1763)
 Scotopteryx mucronata (Scopoli, 1763)
 Scotopteryx obvallaria (Mabille, 1867)
 Scotopteryx octodurensis (Favre, 1903)
 Scotopteryx octodurensis lozerae (Herbulot, 1957)
 Scotopteryx octodurensis nevadina (Wehrli, 1927)
 Scotopteryx octodurensis octodurensis (Favre, 1903)
 Scotopteryx peribolata (Hübner, 1817)
 Scotopteryx perplexaria (Staudinger, 1892)
 Scotopteryx proximaria (Rambur, 1833)
 Scotopteryx roesleri (Vojnits, 1973)
 Scotopteryx sartata (Alphéraky, 1883)
 Scotopteryx sinensis (Alphéraky, 1883)
 Scotopteryx subvicinaria (Staudinger, 1892)
 Scotopteryx supproximata (Staudinger, 1892)
 Scotopteryx transbaicalica (Djakonov, 1955)
 Scotopteryx vicinaria (Duponchel, 1830)
 Scotopteryx vicinaria illyriacaria (Schawerda, 1919)
 Scotopteryx vicinaria vicinaria (Duponchel, 1830)
 Scotopteryx vittistrigata Prout, 1910

References

External links
 Scotopteryx on Fauna Europaea
 Scotopteryx from Portugal